Windyville may refer to:

Windyville, Kentucky, an unincorporated community in Edmonson County
Windyville, Missouri, an unincorporated community in Dallas County

See also
Windy City (disambiguation)